Pekudei, Pekude, Pekudey, P'kude, or P'qude (—Hebrew for "amounts of," the second word, and the first distinctive word, in the parashah) is the 23rd weekly Torah portion (parashah) in the annual Jewish cycle of Torah reading. It is the 11th and last in the Book of Exodus. The parashah tells of the setting up of the Tabernacle (Mishkan). 

It constitutes . The parashah is made up of 4,432 Hebrew letters, 1,182 Hebrew words, 92 verses, and 159 lines in a Torah scroll (Sefer Torah). Jews read it the 22nd or 23rd Sabbath after Simchat Torah, in March. The lunisolar Hebrew calendar contains up to 55 weeks, the exact number varying between 50 in common years and 54 or 55 in leap years. In leap years (for example, 2022, 2024, 2027, 2030, 2033, 2038, 2041, 2043, 2046, and 2049), Parashat Pekudei is read separately. In common years (for example, 2023, 2026, 2028, 2029, 2031, 2032, 2034, 2036, 2039, 2040, 2042, 2044, 2047, 2048, and 2050), Parashat Pekudei is generally combined with the previous parashah, Vayakhel, to help achieve the needed number of weekly readings (although in some non-leap years, such as 2025, 2037, and 2045, they are not combined).

Readings

First reading—Exodus 38:21–39:1
In the first reading, at the direction of Moses, Aaron's son Ithamar oversaw the accounts of the Tabernacle, and the text sets forth the amounts of gold, silver, and copper that Bezalel, Oholiab, and their coworkers used. The silver came from the half-shekel a head for each man 20 years old or older who was counted in the census.

Second reading—Exodus 39:2–21
In the second reading, Bezalel, Oholiab, and their coworkers made the priests' vestments, the ephod, and the breastpiece—just as God had commanded Moses.

Third reading—Exodus 39:22–32
In the third reading, Bezalel, Oholiab, and their coworkers made the robe, the tunics of fine linen, and the frontlet inscribed "Holy to the Lord"—just as God had commanded Moses.

Fourth reading—Exodus 39:33–43

In the fourth reading, they brought the Tabernacle and all its furnishings to Moses, and he blessed them.

Fifth reading—Exodus 40:1–16

In the fifth reading, God told Moses to set up the Tabernacle, and Moses did just as God had commanded him.

Sixth reading—Exodus 40:17–27
In the sixth reading, it was the first day of the second year of the Exodus that Moses erected the Tabernacle and its furnishings—just as God had commanded Moses.

Seventh reading—Exodus 40:28–38
In the seventh reading, Moses finished the work, and the cloud covered the Tent of Meeting, and God's Presence filled the Tabernacle. When the cloud lifted from the Tabernacle, the Israelites would set out, and when the cloud did not lift, they would not set out. And God's cloud rested over the Tabernacle by day, and fire would appear in it by night, throughout the Israelites' journeys.

Readings according to the triennial cycle
Jews who read the Torah according to the triennial cycle of Torah reading may read the parashah according to a different schedule.

In inner-Biblical interpretation
The parashah has parallels or is discussed in these Biblical sources:

Exodus chapters 25–39
This is the pattern of instruction and construction of the Tabernacle and its furnishings:

Exodus chapter 39

Exodus chapters 39–40
As the creation story unfolds in seven days, the instructions about the Tabernacle unfold in seven speeches. In both creation and Tabernacle accounts, the text notes the completion of the task. In both creation and Tabernacle, the work done is seen to be good. In both creation and Tabernacle, when the work is finished, God takes an action in acknowledgement. In both creation and Tabernacle, when the work is finished, a blessing is invoked. And in both creation and Tabernacle, God declares something "holy."

Jeffrey Tigay noted that the lampstand held seven candles, Aaron wore seven sacral vestments, the account of the building of the Tabernacle alludes to the creation account, and the Tabernacle was completed on New Year’s day. And Carol Meyers noted that  and  list seven kinds of substances—metals, yarn, skins, wood, oil, spices, and gemstones—signifying the totality of supplies. Martin Buber and others noted that the language used to describe the building of the Tabernacle parallels that used in the story of creation:

In early nonrabbinic interpretation
The parashah has parallels or is discussed in these early nonrabbinic sources:

Exodus chapter 38
Josephus taught that when the Israelites brought together the materials with great diligence, Moses set architects over the works by the command of God. And these were the very same people that the people themselves would have chosen, had the election been allowed to them: Bezalel, the son of Uri, of the tribe of Judah, the grandson of Miriam, the sister of Moses, and Oholiab, file son of Ahisamach, of the tribe of Dan.

In classical rabbinic interpretation
The parashah is discussed in these rabbinic sources from the era of the Mishnah and the Talmud:

Exodus chapter 38
The Midrash Tanḥuma taught that God considers studying the sanctuary’s structure as equivalent to rebuilding it.

Reading , "These are the accounts of the Tabernacle," Rabbi Tanḥuma cited , "A faithful man shall abound with blessings; but he that makes haste to be rich shall not be unpunished." Rabbi Tanḥuma taught that God always brings blessings through a person of integrity, but one who is not faithful and "makes haste to be rich shall not be unpunished." The Midrash taught that "a faithful man" refers to Moses, who was God's confidant, as  reports, "My servant Moses . . . is trusted in all My house." Another explanation of "A faithful man" is that it refers to Moses, who was made treasurer over the work of the Tabernacle. But our Rabbis taught (in Mishnah Shekalim 5:2), "One must not appoint fewer than two people to control the finances of a city or community," and the Midrash asked whether Moses was not solely in charge. The Midrash answered that although Moses was the sole treasurer, he called others to audit the accounts. The Midrash noted that  says, "These are the accounts of the Tabernacle," and does not say, "which Moses rendered," but "which were rendered according to the commandment of Moses." Thus the accounts were rendered through Moses but, as  reports, "by the hand of Ithamar" (implying that Moses showed all the accounts to Ithamar).

Reading , "as they were rendered according to the commandment of Moses," a Midrash taught that the Israelites did everything that they did by the command of Moses. Even though everything was done with witnesses, as soon as the construction of the Tabernacle was completed, Moses wasted no time to promise the people the complete details of all the expenditures involved. While engaged in this calculation, Moses completely forgot about 1,775 shekalim of silver that he had used for hooks for the pillars, and he became uneasy thinking to himself that the Israelites would find grounds to say that Moses took them for himself. So God opened the eyes of Moses to realize that the silver had been converted into hooks for the pillars. When the Israelites saw that the account now completely tallied, they were completely satisfied with the integrity of the work on the Tabernacle. And thus  says, "These are the accounts of the Tabernacle," to report that the accounts balanced. The Midrash explained that Moses overheard certain Israelites scoffing behind his back, for  says, "And they (the Israelites) looked after Moses." The Midrash asked what the people would say about Moses. Rabbi Joḥanan taught that the people blessed his mother, for she never saw him, as he was always speaking with God and always wholly given over to his service. But Rabbi Hama said that they used to remark how fat and prosperous Moses looked. When Moses heard this, he vowed to give an account of everything. And this is why  says, "These are the accounts of the Tabernacle."

Rabbi Isaac explained with a parable. A king took a wife whom he dearly loved. He became angry with her and left her, and her neighbors taunted her, saying that he would not return. Then the king sent her a message asking her to prepare the king's palace and make the beds therein, for he was coming back to her on such-and-such a day. On that day, the king returned to her and became reconciled to her, entering her chamber and eating and drinking with her. Her neighbors at first did not believe it, but when they smelled the fragrant spices, they knew that the king had returned. Similarly, God loved Israel, bringing the Israelites to Mount Sinai, and giving them the Torah, but after only 40 days, they sinned with the Golden Calf. The heathen nations then said that God would not be reconciled with the Israelites. But when Moses pleaded for mercy on their behalf, God forgave them, as  reports, "And the Lord said: ‘I have pardoned according to your word.'" Moses then told God that even though he personally was quite satisfied that God had forgiven Israel, he asked that God might announce that fact to the nations. God replied that God would cause God's Shechinah to dwell in their midst, and thus  says, "And let them make Me a sanctuary, that I may dwell among them." And by that sign, God intended that all nations might know that God had forgiven the Israelites. And thus  calls it "the Tabernacle of the testimony," because the Tabernacle was a testimony that God had pardoned the Israelites' sins.

Rabbi Tanḥuma taught in the name of Rav Huna that even the things that Bezalel did not hear from Moses he conceived of on his own exactly as they were told to Moses from Sinai. For  does not say, "that Moses commanded him," but, "that the Lord commanded Moses." And the Agadat Shir ha-Shirim taught that Bezalel and Oholiab went up Mount Sinai, where the heavenly Sanctuary was shown to them.

A Midrash explained that Israel sinned with fire in making the Golden Calf, as  says, "And I cast it into the fire, and there came out this calf." And then Bezalel came and healed the wound (and the construction of the Tabernacle made atonement for the sins of the people in making the Golden Calf). The Midrash taught that Bezalel was the smith whom God had created to address the fire. And the Midrash likened it to the case of a doctor's disciple who applied a plaster to a wound and healed it. When people began to praise him, his teacher, the doctor, said that they should praise the doctor, for he taught the disciple. Similarly, when everybody said that Bezalel had constructed the Tabernacle through his knowledge and understanding, God said that it was God who created him and taught him, as  says, "Behold, I have created the smith."

 identifies Bezalel's grandfather as Ḥur, whom either Rav or Samuel deduced was the son of Miriam and Caleb. A Midrash explained that  mentions Ḥur, because when the Israelites were about to serve the Golden Calf, Ḥur risked his life on God's behalf to prevent them from doing so, and they killed him. Whereupon God assured Ḥur that God would repay him for his sacrifice. The Midrash likened it to the case of a king whose legions rebelled against him, and his field marshal fought against the rebels, questioning how they could dare rebel against the king. In the end, the rebels killed the field marshal. The king reasoned that if the field marshal had given the king money, the king would have had to repay him. So even more so the king had an obligation to repay the field marshal when he gave his life on the king's behalf. The king rewarded the field marshal by ordaining that all his male offspring would become generals and officers. Similarly, when Israel made the Golden Calf, Ḥur gave his life for the glory of God. Thus, God assured Ḥur that God would give all Ḥur's descendants a great name in the world. And thus  says, "see, the Lord has called by name Bezalel, the son of Uri, the son of Ḥur."

Rabbi Joḥanan taught that God proclaims three things for God's Self: famine, plenty, and a good leader. 2 Kings  shows that God proclaims famine, when it says: "The Lord has called for a famine."  shows that God proclaims plenty, when it says: "I will call for the corn and will increase it." And  shows that God proclaims a good leader, when it says: "And the Lord spoke to Moses, saying, ‘See I have called by name Bezalel, the son of Uri.'" Rabbi Isaac taught that we cannot appoint a leader over a community without first consulting the people, as  says: "And Moses said unto the children of Israel: ‘See, the Lord has called by name Bezalel, the son of Uri.'" Rabbi Isaac taught that God asked Moses whether Moses considered Bezalel suitable. Moses replied that if God thought Bezalel suitable, surely Moses must also. God told Moses that, all the same, Moses should go and consult the people. Moses then asked the Israelites whether they considered Bezalel suitable. They replied that if God and Moses considered Bezalel suitable, then surely they had to, as well. Rabbi Samuel bar Naḥmani said in the name of Rabbi Joḥanan that Bezalel (whose name can be read , betzel El, "in the shadow of God") was so called because of his wisdom. When God told Moses (in ) to tell Bezalel to make a tabernacle, an ark, and vessels, Moses reversed the order and told Bezalel to make an ark, vessels, and a tabernacle. Bezalel replied to Moses that as a rule, one first builds a house and then brings vessels into it, but Moses directed to make an ark, vessels, and a tabernacle. Bezalel asked where he would put the vessels. And Bezalel asked whether God had told Moses to make a tabernacle, an ark, and vessels. Moses replied that perhaps Bezalel had been in the shadow of God (betzel El) and had thus come to know this. Rav Judah taught in the name of Rav that  indicated that God endowed Bezalel with the same attribute that God used in creating the universe. Rav Judah said in the name of Rav that Bezalel knew how to combine the letters by which God created the heavens and earth. For  says (about Bezalel), "And He has filled him with the spirit of God, in wisdom and in understanding, and in knowledge," and  says (about creation), "The Lord by wisdom founded the earth; by understanding He established the heavens," and  says, "By His knowledge the depths were broken up."

And  reports that Caleb fathered the Ḥur who fathered Uri who fathered Bezalel.  reports that "wise men . . . wrought all the work of the Sanctuary," so Bezalel must have been at least 13 years old to have been a man when he worked on the Tabernacle. A Baraita taught that Moses made the Tabernacle in the first year after the Exodus, and in the second, he erected it and sent out the spies, so the Gemara deduced that Bezalel must have been at least 14 years old when Moses sent out the spies, the year after Bezalel worked on the Tabernacle. And  reports that Caleb said that he was 40 years old when Moses sent him to spy out the land. Thus, the Gemara deduced that Caleb was only 26 years older than his great-grandson Bezalel. Deducting two years for the three pregnancies needed to create the three intervening generations, the Gemara concluded that each of Caleb, Ḥur, and Uri must have conceived his son at the age of eight.

Rabbi Judah ben Simon taught that God required each of the Israelites to give a half-shekel (as reported in ) because (as reported in ) their ancestors had sold Joseph to the Ishmaelites for 20 shekels.

Exodus chapter 39
The Midrash compared this to the case of a king who commanded his servant to build him a palace. On everything the servant built, he wrote the name of the king. The servant wrote the name of the king on the walls, the pillars, and the roof beams. After some time, the king entered the palace, and on everything he saw he found his name. The king thought that the servant had done him all this honor, and yet the servant remained outside. So the king had called that the servant might come right in. So, too, when God directed Moses to make God a Tabernacle, Moses wrote on everything he made "Even as the Lord commanded Moses." God thought that Moses had done God all this honor, and yet Moses remained outside. So God call Moses so that he might enter the innermost part of the Tabernacle. Therefore,  reports, "And the Lord called to Moses." Rabbi Samuel bar Naḥman said in the name of Rabbi Nathan that "as the Lord commanded" is written 18 times in the section recounting the setting up of the Tabernacle in Parashat Pekudei, corresponding to the 18 vertebrae of the spinal column. Likewise, the Sages instituted 18 benedictions of the Amidah prayer, corresponding to the 18 mentions of the Divine Name in the reading of the Shema, and also in Psalm .

Rabbi Judah ben Pazi noted that a similar word appears in both —where , rakya, is translated as "firmament"—and —where , vayraku, is translated as "and they flattened." He thus deduced from the usage in  that  taught that on the second day of creation, God spread the heavens flat like a cloth. Or Rabbi Judah ben Simon deduced from  that  meant "let a lining be made for the firmament."

They made its hems of turquoise, purple, and crimson wool, twisted together and formed into the shape of pomegranates whose mouths were not yet opened (as overripe pomegranates open slightly) and in the shape of the cones of the helmets on children's heads. Seventy-two bells containing 72 clappers were hung on the robe, 36 on each side (front and behind). Rabbi Dosa (or others say, Judah the Prince) said in the name of Rabbi Judah that there were 36 bells in all, 18 on each side.

The Pesikta Rabbati taught that when the Israelites continually complained, God asked them to build the Tabernacle, so that they would be too busy to complain. But when, as  reports, all the work of the Tabernacle was finished, God exclaimed, "Woe is Me! It is finished!"

Reading , "its hooks, its frames, its bars, its pillars, and its bases," Rabbi Yose the son of Rabbi Bun taught that people could see the Tabernacle's hooks from the inside, and they looked like stars in the firmament.

Reading , "and they brought the Tabernacle," a Midrash taught that on the day that the Tabernacle was set up, the Israelites rejoiced greatly because God then dwelt in their midst. And the people sang the words of Song of Songs , "Go forth, O you daughters of Zion, and gaze upon King Solomon, even upon the crown wherewith his mother has crowned him in the day of his espousals, and in the day of the gladness of his heart." "O you daughters of Zion" were the children who are distinguished as God's from among the peoples. "And gaze upon King Solomon" meant "gaze upon a King to whom all peace belongs" (reading the name Solomon as a play on the word "His peace")—that is, upon the King of kings, God. "Even upon the crown wherewith his mother has crowned him" referred to the Tabernacle, which was called a crown because just as a crown has beautiful designs, so was the Tabernacle beautifully designed. "In the day of his espousals" referred to Sinai (at the Revelation). "And in the day of the gladness of his heart" referred to Jerusalem (when God caused God's presence to dwell in the Temple in Jerusalem). According to another explanation, "in the day of his espousals" was the day when God was with Israel at the Red Sea, and "in the day of the gladness of his heart" was when God's presence dwelt in the Tent of Meeting. And according to yet another explanation, "in the day of his espousals" was in the Tabernacle, and "in the day of the gladness of his heart" was in the Temple (when they were erected).

Exodus chapter 40
The Midrash taught that Jacob did not ask simply for food and garments, but that God would promise to be with him and build up the world from him. And Jacob would know that God was with him and guarded him when God would raise up from him sons who would be priests, eating of the showbread and clothed in the priestly garments.

A Midrash taught that many wise people were there, yet they had to come to Moses, for they could not erect the Tabernacle on their own. So each of the wise people took a finished piece of work and came to Moses to present him the boards, the bars, and all the parts. As soon as Moses saw the parts, the Holy Spirit settled on him, and he set the Tabernacle up. The Midrash clarified that Moses did not set it up by himself, for miracles were performed with it, and it rose of its own accord, for  says (using the passive voice), "The Tabernacle was reared up." And the Midrash taught that Solomon's Temple, too, was built of its own accord. Similarly, noting that  reports that "the Tabernacle was reared up"—using the passive voice—another Midrash told that when in  God told Moses to set up the Tabernacle, Moses protested that he did not know how to set it up. So God told Moses to begin working with his hands and make a show of setting it up, and the Tabernacle would stand up on its own. But God reassured Moses that God would record that Moses set it up, as  reports, "Moses reared up the Tabernacle."

Rav Havivi (or others say Rav Assi of Hozna'ah) deduced from the words, "And it came to pass in the first month of the second year, on the first day of the month," in  that the Tabernacle was erected on the first of Nisan. With reference to this, a Tanna taught that the first of Nisan took ten crowns of distinction by virtue of the ten momentous events that occurred on that day. The first of Nisan was: (1) the first day of the Creation, (2) the first day of the princes' offerings, (3) the first day for the priesthood to make the sacrificial offerings, (4) the first day for public sacrifice, (5) the first day for the descent of fire from Heaven, (6) the first for the priests' eating of sacred food in the sacred area, (7) the first for the dwelling of the Shechinah in Israel, (8) the first for the Priestly Blessing of Israel, (9) the first for the prohibition of the high places, and (10) the first of the months of the year.

Judah ha-Nasi read the verse to teach that once Moses, who was at a higher level of sanctity than the rest of the people, began the work of erecting the Tabernacle, he alone completed it, as the involvement of any other people would have been considered a step down.

In , Moses foretold that "A prophet will the Lord your God raise up for you . . . like me," and Rabbi Joḥanan thus taught that prophets would have to be, like Moses, strong, wealthy, wise, and meek. Strong, for  says of Moses, "he spread the tent over the Tabernacle," and a Master taught that Moses himself spread it, and  reports, "Ten cubits shall be the length of a board." Wealthy, as  reports God's instruction to Moses, "Carve yourself two tablets of stone," and the Rabbis interpreted the verse to teach that the chips would belong to Moses. Wise, for Rav and Samuel both said that 50 gates of understanding were created in the world, and all but one were given to Moses, for  said of Moses, "You have made him a little lower than God." Meek, for  reports, "Now the man Moses was very meek."

The Mishnah taught that any sacrifice performed by a priest who had not washed his hands and feet at the laver (described in ) was invalid.

Rabbi Jose the son of Rabbi Ḥanina taught that a priest was not permitted to wash in a laver that did not contain enough water to wash four priests, for  says, "That Moses and Aaron and his sons might wash their hands and their feet thereat." ("His sons" implies at least two priests, and adding Moses and Aaron makes four.)

The Mishnah reported that the High Priest Ben Katin made 12 spigots for the laver, where there had been two before. Ben Katin also made a machine for the laver, so that its water would not become unfit by remaining overnight.

Rabbi Joshua of Siknin taught in the name of Rabbi Levi that the Tent of Meeting was like a cave by the sea that the sea fills when it becomes rough. Though the cave becomes filled, the sea loses nothing. So the glory of the Divine Presence, the Shechinah, filled the Tent of Meeting, and yet the world lost nothing of the Shechinah. And the Shechinah rested on the world on the day when Moses set up the Tabernacle.

A Midrash taught that seven righteous men arose who brought the Shechinah down from the celestial to the terrestrial regions. Abraham brought it down from the seventh region to the sixth, Isaac brought it down from the sixth to the fifth, Jacob brought it down from the fifth to the fourth, Levi brought it down from the fourth to the third, Kohath brought it down from the third to the second, Amram brought it down from the second to the first, and Moses brought it down from the celestial to the terrestrial region. Rabbi Isaac read , "The righteous shall inherit the earth, and dwell (veyishkenu) therein forever," to teach that the wicked caused the Shechinah to depart from the earth, but the righteous have caused the Shechinah to dwell (hishkinu) on the earth. And the Shechinah came to rest on the earth on the day when Moses erected the Tabernacle, as  reports, "Then the cloud covered the tent of meeting, and the glory of the Lord filled the Tabernacle."

Rabbi Zerika asked about an apparent contradiction of Scriptural passages in the presence of Rabbi Eleazar, or, according to another version, he asked in the name of Rabbi Eleazar.  reads: "And Moses was not able to enter into the tent of meeting because the cloud abode thereon," whereas  says: "And Moses entered into the midst of the cloud." The Gemara concluded that this teaches us that God took hold of Moses and brought him into the cloud.

But when night came, the pillar of fire descended and surrounded the Tabernacle. All the Israelites saw it as one flame of fire and began to weep in sorrow, feeling that they had labored (building the Tabernacle) for nothing, as all their work appeared to have been burnt up in a moment. When they arose early the next morning and saw the pillar of cloud encompassing the Tabernacle, they immediately rejoiced with an inordinate joy.

In medieval Jewish interpretation
The parashah is discussed in these medieval Jewish sources:

Exodus chapter 38
Bezalel was from the Tribe of Judah, representing the attribute of Mercy, and Oholiab was from the Tribe of Dan, representing the attribute of Justice (din).

In modern interpretation
The parashah is discussed in these modern sources:

Exodus chapter 38
 reports that Bezalel and Oholiab used roughly a ton of gold in making the Tabernacle. According to one estimate, the metal listed in  amounted to 2,210 pounds of gold, 7,601 pounds of silver, and 5,350 pounds of copper. By comparison, an inscription from Bubastis reports that the Ancient Egyptian king Osorkon I dedicated more than 391 tons of gold and silver objects to Egyptian temples in the first four years of his reign. This table translates units of weight used in the Bible:

Exodus chapter 39

Nahum Sarna wrote that the combination of the two distinct terms for the sanctuary together expresses its dual function as the symbol of the indwelling of the Divine Presence in the camp of Israel and as the site of communication between God and Moses. Gunther Plaut concluded that the two terms probably reflect two traditions, one using the term "Tabernacle" (Mishkan) and the other the term "Tent" (Ohel). Plaut reported that the school of Julius Wellhausen considered the "Tent" tradition the older and the "Tabernacle" passages as retrojections of the Priestly source and therefore as largely unhistorical.
(Mishkan Ohel Mo-ed) was coined.

Exodus chapter 40

Everett Fox noted that “glory” (kevod) and “stubbornness” (kaved lev) are leading words throughout the book of Exodus that give it a sense of unity.

Commandments
According to Maimonides and Sefer ha-Chinuch, there are no commandments in the parashah.

In the liturgy
A Midrash taught that on the day that Moses completed construction of the Tabernacle (as reported in ), he composed , which Jews read in the Pesukei D'Zimrah section of the morning Shacharit prayer service.

Haftarah

Generally
The haftarah for the parashah when there is no special Sabbath is:
for Sephardi Jews: 1 Kings 
for Ashkenazi Jews:

Sephardi—1 Kings 7:40–50
Both the parashah and the haftarah in  report the leader's erection of the holy place—Moses' setting up the Tabernacle in the parashah, and Solomon's building of the Temple in Jerusalem in the haftarah.

Ashkenazi—1 Kings 7:51–8:21
And in both the parashah and the haftarah, a cloud and the Presence of the Lord fill the Sanctuary, indicating God's approval.

Parashat Vayakhel–Pekudei
When Parashat Vayakhel is combined with Parashat Pekudei and there is no special Sabbath, the haftarah is:
for Ashkenazi Jews: 
for Sephardi Jews:

On Shabbat HaChodesh
When the parashah coincides with Shabbat HaChodesh ("Sabbath [of] the month," the special Sabbath preceding the Hebrew month of Nissan—as it does in 2023, 2025, 2026, 2028, 2031, 2034, 2037, 2040, 2044, 2045, 2047, and 2048), the haftarah is: 
for Ashkenazi Jews: .
for Sephardi Jews: .
On Shabbat HaChodesh, Jews read , in which God commands that "This month (Nissan) shall be the beginning of months; it shall be the first month of the year," and in which God issued the commandments of Passover. Similarly, the haftarah in  discusses Passover. In both the parashah and the haftarah, God instructs the Israelites to apply blood to doorposts.

On Shabbat Parah
When the parashah coincides with Shabbat Parah (the special Sabbath prior to Passover—as it does in 2029, 2032, 2036, 2039, and 2042), the haftarah is:
for Ashkenazi Jews: .
for Sephardi Jews: . 
On Shabbat Parah, the Sabbath of the red heifer, Jews read , which describes the rites of purification using the red heifer (parah adumah). Similarly, the haftarah in Ezekiel 36 also describes purification. In both the special reading and the haftarah in Ezekiel 36, sprinkled water cleansed the Israelites.

On Shabbat Shekalim

On Shabbat Rosh Chodesh

Notes

Further reading
The parashah has parallels or is discussed in these sources:

Biblical

Early nonrabbinic
Philo. Who Is the Heir of Divine Things? 26:131. Alexandria, Egypt, early 1st Century CE. In, e.g., The Works of Philo: Complete and Unabridged, New Updated Edition. Translated by Charles Duke Yonge, 287. Peabody, Massachusetts: Hendrickson Publishers, 1993.
Josephus, Antiquities of the Jews 3:6:1–10:1. Circa 93–94. In, e.g., The Works of Josephus: Complete and Unabridged, New Updated Edition. Translated by William Whiston, 85–95. Peabody, Massachusetts: Hendrickson Publishers, 1987.

Classical rabbinic
Seder Olam Rabbah, chapter 7. 2nd century CE. In, e.g., Seder Olam: The Rabbinic View of Biblical Chronology. Translated and with commentary by Heinrich W. Guggenheimer, pages 79–87. Lanham, Maryland: Jason Aronson, 1998.
Mishnah: Shekalim 5:2; Yoma 3:10; Zevachim 2:1. Land of Israel, circa 200 CE. In, e.g., The Mishnah: A New Translation. Translated by Jacob Neusner, pages 259, 269, 700–01. New Haven: Yale University Press, 1988.
Tosefta: Zevachim 1:8; Menachot 7:7–8. Land of Israel, circa 250 C.E. In, e.g., The Tosefta: Translated from the Hebrew, with a New Introduction. Translated by Jacob Neusner, volume 2, pages 1310, 1434–35. Peabody, Massachusetts: Hendrickson Publishers, 2002.
Jerusalem Talmud: Berakhot 6a; Peah 5a; Kilayim 76a; Shabbat 20b; Shekalim 1a; Sukkah 8a, 27a; Rosh Hashanah 2b, 6a; Taanit 10b; Ketubot 30a; Sanhedrin 12a. Tiberias, Land of Israel, circa 400 CE. In, e.g., Talmud Yerushalmi. Edited by Chaim Malinowitz, Yisroel Simcha Schorr, and Mordechai Marcus, volumes 1, 3, 5, 13, 20, 22, 24–25, 31, 44. Brooklyn: Mesorah Publications, 2005–2020.
Genesis Rabbah 3:9; 4:2; 84:18. Land of Israel, 5th Century. In, e.g., Midrash Rabbah: Genesis. Translated by Harry Freedman and Maurice Simon, volume 1, pages 25, 27; volume 2, page 783. London: Soncino Press, 1939.

Midrash Tanḥuma Pekudei. 5th–10th centuries. In, e.g., The Metsudah Midrash Tanchuma: Shemos II. Translated and annotated by Avrohom Davis; edited by Yaakov Y.H. Pupko, volume 4 (Shemos volume 2), pages 390–457. Monsey, New York: Eastern Book Press, 2004.
Babylonian Talmud: Berakhot 55a; Shabbat 28a, 87b; Yoma 4b, 6a, 12a–b, 32a, 37a, 71b; Sukkah 7b, 21a; Rosh Hashanah 3a; Taanit 29a; Megillah 29b; Yevamot 4b; Nedarim 38a; Sotah 11b, 37a, 38a; Sanhedrin 69b; Zevachim 15b, 19a–b, 22a, 58b, 88b, 119a–b; Menachot 62a, 98a, 99a; Chullin 138a; Bekhorot 5a, 44a; Arakhin 3b. Sasanian Empire, 6th Century. In, e.g., Talmud Bavli. Edited by Yisroel Simcha Schorr, Chaim Malinowitz, and Mordechai Marcus, 72 volumes. Brooklyn: Mesorah Publications, 2006.

Medieval
Bede. Of the Tabernacle and Its Vessels, and of the Priestly Vestments. Monkwearmouth, England, 720s. In Bede: On the Tabernacle. Translated with notes and introduction by Arthur G. Holder. Liverpool: Liverpool University Press, 1994.
Exodus Rabbah 51:1–52:5. 10th Century. 10th Century. In, e.g., Midrash Rabbah: Exodus. Translated by Simon M. Lehrman, 3:562–81. London: Soncino Press, 1939.

Rashi. Commentary. Exodus 38–40. Troyes, France, late 11th Century. In, e.g., Rashi. The Torah: With Rashi's Commentary Translated, Annotated, and Elucidated. Translated and annotated by Yisrael Isser Zvi Herczeg, volume 2, pages 507–24. Brooklyn: Mesorah Publications, 1994.
Rashbam. Commentary on the Torah. Troyes, early 12th century. In, e.g., Rashbam's Commentary on Exodus: An Annotated Translation. Edited and translated by Martin I. Lockshin, pages 431–38. Atlanta: Scholars Press, 1997.
Judah Halevi. Kuzari. 3:23. Toledo, Spain, 1130–1140. In, e.g., Jehuda Halevi. Kuzari: An Argument for the Faith of Israel. Introduction by Henry Slonimsky, page 162. New York: Schocken Books, 1964.

Abraham ibn Ezra. Commentary on the Torah. France, 1153. In, e.g., Ibn Ezra's Commentary on the Pentateuch: Exodus (Shemot). Translated and annotated by H. Norman Strickman and Arthur M. Silver, volume 2, pages 747–66. New York: Menorah Publishing Company, 1996.
Maimonides. The Guide for the Perplexed. Cairo, Egypt, 1190. In, e.g., Moses Maimonides. The Guide for the Perplexed. Translated by Michael Friedländer, pages 29, 96. New York: Dover Publications, 1956.

Hezekiah ben Manoah. Hizkuni. France, circa 1240. In, e.g., Chizkiyahu ben Manoach. Chizkuni: Torah Commentary. Translated and annotated by Eliyahu Munk, volume 3, pages 651–55. Jerusalem: Ktav Publishers, 2013.
Naḥmanides. Commentary on the Torah. Jerusalem, circa 1270. In, e.g., Ramban (Nachmanides): Commentary on the Torah. Translated by Charles B. Chavel, volume 2, pages 609–26. New York: Shilo Publishing House, 1973.

Zohar part 2, pages 220a–269a. Spain, late 13th Century. In, e.g., The Zohar: Pritzker Edition. Translation and commentary by Daniel C. Matt, volume 6, pages 258–415. Stanford: Stanford University Press, 2011.
Bahya ben Asher. Commentary on the Torah. Spain, early 14th century. In, e.g., Midrash Rabbeinu Bachya: Torah Commentary by Rabbi Bachya ben Asher. Translated and annotated by Eliyahu Munk, volume 4, pages 1438–62. Jerusalem: Lambda Publishers, 2003.
Jacob ben Asher (Baal Ha-Turim). Commentary on the Torah. Early 14th century. In, e.g., Baal Haturim Chumash: Shemos/Exodus. Translated by Eliyahu Touger; edited and annotated by Avie Gold, volume 2, pages 959–83. Brooklyn: Mesorah Publications, 2000.
Isaac ben Moses Arama. Akedat Yizhak (The Binding of Isaac). Late 15th century. In, e.g., Yitzchak Arama. Akeydat Yitzchak: Commentary of Rabbi Yitzchak Arama on the Torah. Translated and condensed by Eliyahu Munk, volume 1, pages 535–44. New York, Lambda Publishers, 2001.

Modern
Isaac Abravanel. Commentary on the Torah. Italy, between 1492–1509. In, e.g., Abarbanel: Selected Commentaries on the Torah: Volume 2: Shemos/Exodus. Translated and annotated by Israel Lazar, pages 421–49. Brooklyn: CreateSpace, 2015.
Abraham Saba. Ẓeror ha-Mor (Bundle of Myrrh). Fez, Morocco, circa 1500. In, e.g., Tzror Hamor: Torah Commentary by Rabbi Avraham Sabba. Translated and annotated by Eliyahu Munk, volume 3, pages 1229–38. Jerusalem, Lambda Publishers, 2008.
Joseph Garçon. "Sermon on Elleh Fequde." Salonika, 1500. In Marc Saperstein. Jewish Preaching, 1200–1800: An Anthology, pages 199–216. New Haven: Yale University Press, 1989.
Obadiah ben Jacob Sforno. Commentary on the Torah. Venice, 1567. In, e.g., Sforno: Commentary on the Torah. Translation and explanatory notes by Raphael Pelcovitz, pages 486–95. Brooklyn: Mesorah Publications, 1997.
Moses Almosnino. "Sermon on Elleh Fequde." Salonika, 1568. In Marc Saperstein. Jewish Preaching, 1200–1800: An Anthology, pages 217–39. New Haven: Yale University Press, 1989.
Moshe Alshich. Commentary on the Torah. Safed, circa 1593. In, e.g., Moshe Alshich. Midrash of Rabbi Moshe Alshich on the Torah. Translated and annotated by Eliyahu Munk, volume 2, pages 615–18. New York, Lambda Publishers, 2000.

Shlomo Ephraim Luntschitz. Kli Yakar. Lublin, 1602. In, e.g., Kli Yakar: Shemos. Translated by Elihu Levine, volume 2, pages 372–93. Southfield, Michigan: Targum Press/Feldheim Publishers, 2007.
Thomas Hobbes. Leviathan, 4:44. England, 1651. Reprint edited by C. B. Macpherson, page 643. Harmondsworth, England: Penguin Classics, 1982.
Chaim ibn Attar. Ohr ha-Chaim. Venice, 1742. In Chayim ben Attar. Or Hachayim: Commentary on the Torah. Translated by Eliyahu Munk, volume 2, pages 909–23. Brooklyn: Lambda Publishers, 1999.
Yitzchak Magriso. Me'am Lo'ez. Constantinople, 1746. In Yitzchak Magriso. The Torah Anthology: Me'am Lo'ez. Translated by Aryeh Kaplan, volume 10, pages 249–321. Jerusalem: Moznaim Publishing, 1991.

Nachman of Breslov. Teachings. Bratslav, Ukraine, before 1811. In Rebbe Nachman's Torah: Breslov Insights into the Weekly Torah Reading: Exodus-Leviticus. Compiled by Chaim Kramer; edited by Y. Hall, pages 292–98. Jerusalem: Breslov Research Institute, 2011.
Moritz Markus Kalisch. A Historical and Critical Commentary on the Old Testament with a New Translation: Exodus, pages 455–62. London: Longman, Brown, Green, and Longmans, 1855. Reprinted, e.g., RareBooksClub.com, 2012.

Samson Raphael Hirsch. The Pentateuch: Exodus. Translated by Isaac Levy, volume 2, pages 694–712. Gateshead: Judaica Press, 2nd edition 1999. Originally published as Der Pentateuch uebersetzt und erklaert. Frankfurt, 1867–1878.
Samuel David Luzzatto (Shadal). Commentary on the Torah. Padua, 1871. In, e.g., Samuel David Luzzatto. Torah Commentary. Translated and annotated by Eliyahu Munk, volume 3, pages 895–96. New York: Lambda Publishers, 2012.
Yehudah Aryeh Leib Alter. Sefat Emet. Góra Kalwaria (Ger), Poland, before 1906. Excerpted in The Language of Truth: The Torah Commentary of Sefat Emet. Translated and interpreted by Arthur Green, pages 139–43. Philadelphia: Jewish Publication Society, 1998. Reprinted 2012.
Alexander Alan Steinbach. Sabbath Queen: Fifty-four Bible Talks to the Young Based on Each Portion of the Pentateuch, pages 71–73. New York: Behrman's Jewish Book House, 1936.
Benno Jacob. The Second Book of the Bible: Exodus. London, 1940. Translated by Walter Jacob, pages 1032–48. Hoboken, New Jersey: KTAV Publishing House, 1992.

Umberto Cassuto. A Commentary on the Book of Exodus. Jerusalem, 1951. Translated by Israel Abrahams, pages 468–85. Jerusalem: The Magnes Press, The Hebrew University, 1967.
Carol L. Meyers. The Tabernacle Menorah. Missoula, Montana: Scholars Press, 1976.
Elie Munk. The Call of the Torah: An Anthology of Interpretation and Commentary on the Five Books of Moses. Translated by E.S. Mazer, volume 2, pages 530–51. Brooklyn: Mesorah Publications, 1995. Originally published as La Voix de la Thora. Paris: Fondation Samuel et Odette Levy, 1981.
Victor (Avigdor) Hurowitz. "The Priestly Account of Building the Tabernacle." Journal of the American Oriental Society, volume 105 (number 1) (January–March 1985): pages 21–30.
Richard Elliott Friedman. "A Brilliant Mistake" and "The Sacred Tent." In Who Wrote the Bible?, pages 161–87. New York: Summit Books, 1987.
Pinchas H. Peli. Torah Today: A Renewed Encounter with Scripture, pages 99–102. Washington, D.C.: B'nai B'rith Books, 1987.
Gabriel Josipovici. "Building the Tabernacle." In The Book of God: A Response to the Bible, pages 90–107. New Haven: Yale University Press, 1988.
Jon D. Levenson. "Cosmos and Microcosm." In Creation and the Persistence of Evil: The Jewish Drama of Divine Omnipotence, pages 78–99. San Francisco: Harper & Row, 1988.
Craig R. Koester. Dwelling of God: The Tabernacle in the Old Testament, Intertestamental Jewish Literature, and the New Testament. Washington: Catholic Biblical Association of America, 1989.
Harvey J. Fields. A Torah Commentary for Our Times: Volume II: Exodus and Leviticus, pages 86–94. New York: UAHC Press, 1991.
Richard Elliott Friedman. "Tabernacle." in Anchor Bible Dictionary. Edited by David Noel Freedman, volume 6, pages 292–300. New York: Doubleday, 1992.
Nahum M. Sarna. The JPS Torah Commentary: Exodus: The Traditional Hebrew Text with the New JPS Translation, pages 231–37. Philadelphia: Jewish Publication Society, 1991.
Nehama Leibowitz. New Studies in Shemot (Exodus), volume 2, pages 644–53, 689–709. Jerusalem: Haomanim Press, 1993. Reprinted as New Studies in the Weekly Parasha. Lambda Publishers, 2010.
Walter Brueggemann. "The Book of Exodus." In The New Interpreter's Bible. Edited by Leander E. Keck, volume 1, pages 972–81. Nashville: Abingdon Press, 1994.
Judith S. Antonelli. "Women's Wisdom." In In the Image of God: A Feminist Commentary on the Torah, pages 221–30. Northvale, New Jersey: Jason Aronson, 1995.
Victor Avigdor Hurowitz. [https://www.jstor.org/stable/1454824 "The Form and Fate of the Tabernacle: Reflections on a Recent Proposal." The Jewish Quarterly Review, volume 86 (number 1/2) (July–October 1995): pages 127–51.
Ellen Frankel. The Five Books of Miriam: A Woman’s Commentary on the Torah, pages 146–48. New York: G. P. Putnam's Sons, 1996.
W. Gunther Plaut. The Haftarah Commentary, pages 222–31. New York: UAHC Press, 1996.
Sorel Goldberg Loeb and Barbara Binder Kadden. Teaching Torah: A Treasury of Insights and Activities, pages 155–60. Denver: A.R.E. Publishing, 1997.
Elana Zaiman. "The Birthing of the Mishkan (Tabernacle)." In The Women's Torah Commentary: New Insights from Women Rabbis on the 54 Weekly Torah Portions. Edited by Elyse Goldstein, pages 179–82. Woodstock, Vermont: Jewish Lights Publishing, 2000.
Exodus to Deuteronomy: A Feminist Companion to the Bible (Second Series). Edited by Athalya Brenner, page 39. Sheffield: Sheffield Academic Press, 2000.
Martin R. Hauge. The Descent from the Mountain: Narrative Patterns in Exodus 19–40. Sheffield: Journal for the Study of the Old Testament Press, 2001. 
Avivah Gottlieb Zornberg. The Particulars of Rapture: Reflections on Exodus, pages 461–98. New York: Doubleday, 2001.
Lainie Blum Cogan and Judy Weiss. Teaching Haftarah: Background, Insights, and Strategies, pages 145–60. Denver: A.R.E. Publishing, 2002.
Michael Fishbane. The JPS Bible Commentary: Haftarot, pages 135–38, 141–46. Philadelphia: Jewish Publication Society, 2002.
Alan Lew. This Is Real and You Are Completely Unprepared: The Days of Awe as a Journey of Transformation, pages 53–55. Boston: Little, Brown and Co., 2003.
Martha Lynn Wade. Consistency of Translation Techniques in the Tabernacle Accounts of Exodus in the Old Greek. Society of Biblical Literature, 2003.
Robert Alter. The Five Books of Moses: A Translation with Commentary, pages 526–35. New York: W.W. Norton & Co., 2004.
Jeffrey H. Tigay. "Exodus." In The Jewish Study Bible. Edited by Adele Berlin and Marc Zvi Brettler, pages 197–202. New York: Oxford University Press, 2004.
Professors on the Parashah: Studies on the Weekly Torah Reading Edited by Leib Moscovitz, pages 155–60. Jerusalem: Urim Publications, 2005.
W. Gunther Plaut. The Torah: A Modern Commentary: Revised Edition. Revised edition edited by David E.S. Stern, pages 627–39. New York: Union for Reform Judaism, 2006.
William H.C. Propp. Exodus 19–40, volume 2A, pages 624–722. New York: Anchor Bible, 2006.

Suzanne A. Brody. "Successful Campaign." In Dancing in the White Spaces: The Yearly Torah Cycle and More Poems, page 84. Shelbyville, Kentucky: Wasteland Press, 2007.
James L. Kugel. How To Read the Bible: A Guide to Scripture, Then and Now, page 289. New York: Free Press, 2007.
Kenton L. Sparks. “‘Enūma Elish’ and Priestly Mimesis: Elite Emulation in Nascent Judaism.” Journal of Biblical Literature, volume 126 (2007): 637–42. (“Priestly Mimesis in the Tabernacle Narrative (Exodus 25–40)”).
The Torah: A Women's Commentary. Edited by Tamara Cohn Eskenazi and Andrea L. Weiss, pages 545–66. New York: URJ Press, 2008.
Thomas B. Dozeman. Commentary on Exodus, pages 759–66. Grand Rapids, Michigan: William B. Eerdmans Publishing Company, 2009.
Lisa Edwards and Laurence Edwards. "A Knack for Design: Parashat Pekudei (Exodus 38:21–40:38)." In Torah Queeries: Weekly Commentaries on the Hebrew Bible. Edited by Gregg Drinkwater, Joshua Lesser, and David Shneer; foreword by Judith Plaskow, pages 117–20. New York: New York University Press, 2009.
Reuven Hammer. Entering Torah: Prefaces to the Weekly Torah Portion, pages 135–39. New York: Gefen Publishing House, 2009.
Rebecca G.S. Idestrom. "Echoes of the Book of Exodus in Ezekiel." Journal for the Study of the Old Testament, volume 33 (number 4) (June 2009): pages 489–510. (Motifs from Exodus found in Ezekiel, including the call narrative, divine encounters, captivity, signs, plagues, judgment, redemption, tabernacle/temple, are considered.).
Bruce Wells. "Exodus." In Zondervan Illustrated Bible Backgrounds Commentary. Edited by John H. Walton, volume 1, pages 265–67. Grand Rapids, Michigan: Zondervan, 2009.

Carol Meyers. "Exodus." In The New Oxford Annotated Bible: New Revised Standard Version with the Apocrypha: An Ecumenical Study Bible. Edited by Michael D. Coogan, Marc Z. Brettler, Carol A. Newsom, and Pheme Perkins, pages 137–40. New York: Oxford University Press, Revised 4th Edition 2010.
Jonathan Sacks. Covenant & Conversation: A Weekly Reading of the Jewish Bible: Exodus: The Book of Redemption, pages 303–57. Jerusalem: Maggid Books, 2010.
James W. Watts. "Aaron and the Golden Calf in the Rhetoric of the Pentateuch." Journal of Biblical Literature, volume 130 (number 3) (fall 2011): pages 417–30.

William G. Dever. The Lives of Ordinary People in Ancient Israel: When Archaeology and the Bible Intersect, pages 244, 246. Grand Rapids, Michigan: William B. Eerdmans Publishing Company, 2012.
Shmuel Herzfeld. "An Easier Way to Achieve Redemption." In Fifty-Four Pick Up: Fifteen-Minute Inspirational Torah Lessons, pages 135–40. Jerusalem: Gefen Publishing House, 2012.
Torah MiEtzion: New Readings in Tanach: Shemot. Edited by Ezra Bick and Yaakov Beasley, pages 480–530. Jerusalem: Maggid Books, 2012.
Michael B. Hundley. Gods in Dwellings: Temples and Divine Presence in the Ancient Near East. Atlanta: Society of Biblical Literature, 2013.
Pinchas Landau. "One Man's ‘Inequality' Is . . . : A tax that made everyone an equal partner in the Temple service, irrespective of their sociopolitical class." The Jerusalem Report, volume 24 (number 24) (March 10, 2014): page 47.
Jonathan Sacks. Lessons in Leadership: A Weekly Reading of the Jewish Bible, pages 115–19. New Milford, Connecticut: Maggid Books, 2015.
Raanan Eichler. "The Poles of the Ark: On the Ins and Outs of a Textual Contradiction." Journal of Biblical Literature, volume 135, number 4 (Winter 2016): pages 733–41.
Jonathan Sacks. Essays on Ethics: A Weekly Reading of the Jewish Bible, pages 145–49. New Milford, Connecticut: Maggid Books, 2016.

Shai Held. The Heart of Torah, Volume 1: Essays on the Weekly Torah Portion: Genesis and Exodus, pages 217–24. Philadelphia: Jewish Publication Society, 2017.
Steven Levy and Sarah Levy. The JPS Rashi Discussion Torah Commentary, pages 71–73. Philadelphia: Jewish Publication Society, 2017.
Leon R. Kass, Founding God’s Nation, pages 574–98. New Haven: Yale University Press, 2021.

External links

Texts
Masoretic text and 1917 JPS translation
Hear the parashah chanted 
Hear the parashah read in Hebrew

Commentaries

Academy for Jewish Religion, California
Academy for Jewish Religion, New York
Aish.com
Akhlah: The Jewish Children's Learning Network
Aleph Beta Academy
American Jewish University—Ziegler School of Rabbinic Studies
Anshe Emes Synagogue, Los Angeles
Ari Goldwag
Ascent of Safed
Bar-Ilan University
Chabad.org
The Desert Tabernacle
eparsha.com
G-dcast
The Israel Koschitzky Virtual Beit Midrash
Jewish Agency for Israel
Jewish Theological Seminary
Kabbala Online
Mechon Hadar
Miriam Aflalo
MyJewishLearning.com
Ohr Sameach
Orthodox Union
OzTorah, Torah from Australia
Oz Ve Shalom—Netivot Shalom
Pardes from Jerusalem
Professor James L. Kugel
Professor Michael Carasik
Rabbi Dov Linzer
Rabbi Fabian Werbin
Rabbi Jonathan Sacks
RabbiShimon.com
Rabbi Shlomo Riskin
Rabbi Shmuel Herzfeld
Rabbi Stan Levin
Reconstructionist Judaism 
Sephardic Institute
Shiur.com
613.org Jewish Torah Audio
Tanach Study Center
TheTorah.com
Torah from Dixie 
Torah.org
TorahVort.com
Union for Reform Judaism
United Synagogue of Conservative Judaism
What's Bothering Rashi?
Yeshivat Chovevei Torah
Yeshiva University

Weekly Torah readings in Adar
Weekly Torah readings from Exodus